Russ Narcies "Nar" Cabico (born September 16, 1990) is a Filipino singer, stage and TV actor known after being the grand champion of GMA Network's singing contest, Superstar Duets.

Career 
Before entering showbiz, Cabico was already a theatre actor. The last stage play he did was "3 Stars and a Sun", wherein he sang music from the late Francis Magalona. He then appeared in the show "Beautiful Strangers". In 2016, he became the first grand champion of the singing contest "Superstar Duets".

Filmography

Television

Films

Discography

References

External links
 

1990 births
Living people
Filipino LGBT singers
Filipino LGBT actors
Filipino television presenters
21st-century Filipino male actors
Filipino male comedians
GMA Network personalities
GMA Music artists
Filipino male stage actors